Tarjeta de Identificación Consular Guatemalteca (TICG) is Guatemala's consular identification card also known as the Guatemalan CID card.  Guatemala began issuing this card in the United States in August 2002 following the lead of the Mexican government's foreign consular agents in the U.S. who began lobbying U.S. states, municipalities and financial institutions to accept the Mexican CID card in March 2002.

Unlike Mexico's CID card application process, Guatemala requires a valid Guatemalan passport which is checked against Guatemala’s
central passport database system.  Guatemala's passport requires two fingerprints and a photograph and signature.

Bank on California, a program launched by Governor Arnold Schwarzenegger in December 2008, encourages financial institutions to accept the Mexican CID, Guatemalan CID and other CID cards as primary identification for opening bank accounts.

References

External links
 Información de la Tarjeta de Identificación Consular Guatemalteca -TICG- Ministerio de Relaciones Exteriores, República de Guatemala
 Guatemala Tarjeta de Identificación Consular Información Sin Fronteras (ISF)

Consular identification cards
Foreign relations of Guatemala